Rinzia torquata, commonly known as necklace rinzia, is a plant species of the family Myrtaceae endemic to Western Australia.

The shrub is found in the southern Wheatbelt region of Western Australia.

References

torquata
Endemic flora of Western Australia
Myrtales of Australia
Rosids of Western Australia
Vulnerable flora of Australia
Plants described in 2017
Taxa named by Barbara Lynette Rye
Taxa named by Malcolm Eric Trudgen